Blyde Smit (born 1995) is a South African actress and production designer. She is best known for her roles in the series Dead Places, The Construct and 7de Laan.

Personal life
Smit was born in 1995 in Johannesburg, South Africa. In 2014, she entered University of Pretoria to study drama, where she graduated with a bachelor's degree in drama in 2016. Then in 2017 she completed her honors degree in Drama and Film Studies from the same university.

Career
In 2007, she made her television debut with the SABC2 's drama series Erfsondes, where she played the role "Kate" in the first two seasons until 2009. During her life at Pretoria in 2015, she performed in many theatre productions such as; Shedding the Load, Flikflooi and Still. In 2017, she performed in the plays; Kersfees and Koue Tee deur. In 2019, she joined the cast of popular SBC2 soap opera 7de Laan with the role "Gabby Kemp". Then in 2021, she appeared in the serial Dead Places. She is currently featuring in the Showmax show Troukoors (Wedding Fever) as Luca.

Filmography

References

External links
 

Living people
1995 births
21st-century South African actresses
Actresses from Johannesburg
South African television actresses
University of Pretoria alumni
Women production designers